Flight 141 may refer to:

Aeroflot Flight 141, crashed on 19 February 19 1973
UTA Flight 141, crashed on 25 December 2003

0141